Patrick Bellew,  (born June 12, 1959) is an environmental engineer, one of the United Kingdom’s Royal Designers and a chartered building services engineer. He currently works at and is a founding director of building environmental engineering consultants Atelier Ten. He also lectures at various universities on issues that affect the environment. Atelier Ten has pioneered numerous environmental innovations and it has six offices around the world which are focused on the delivery of high-performance buildings.

Education and career
Bellew attended Stonyhurst College before proceeding to the University of Bath where he studied for his Bachelor of Science honors at the school of architecture and building engineering until 1981. He was employed at Buro Happold in Bath after completing his four-year degree. Bellew has taught the core environmental design course on the M.Arch program at the Yale University School of Architecture from 2000 - 2009, and he led advanced design studios in 2010 and 2011. He was on the Design Review Committee of CABE from 1999 to 2003, a governor of the Building Centre Trust in London between 1996 and 2011 and on the employer panel of the Construction Industry Council.

Publications
He writes in several United Kingdom design magazines;
 RIBA Journal.
 CIBSE Journal (Chartered Institution of Building Services Engineers).
 BSD magazine (Building Sustainable Designs)

Awards
 In 2001, he was awarded the honorary fellow of the Royal Institute of British Architects.
 In 2004, he became a fellow of the Royal Academy of Engineering.
 In 2008, he delivered the 6th Happold Medal Lecture and received the Happold Medal from the Construction Industry Council and the Happold Foundation.
 Award to the Royal Designers for Industry which he was offered on 25 November 2010.

References

External links
 Homepage

Fellows of the Royal Academy of Engineering
Living people
1959 births
Royal Designers for Industry